This chronological list of erotic films is organized by decade. There may be considerable overlap between erotica and other genres including drama, horror and comedy. The list attempts to document films which are more closely related to erotica, even if it bends genres. Erotic thrillers are listed on a separate page.

1950s

1960s

1970s

1980s

1990s

2000s

2010s

2020s

See also
List of French erotic films
Pre-Code sex films
Sex in film
List of erotic thriller films

References

Lists of films by genre